Pir Ali (also Romanized as Pīr ‘Alī) is a village in Shah Jahan Rural District, in the Central District of Faruj County, North Khorasan Province, Iran. At the 2006 census, its population was 246, in 57 families.

References 

Populated places in Faruj County